The 2016 Eschborn-Frankfurt – Rund um den Finanzplatz was the 54th edition of the Eschborn-Frankfurt – Rund um den Finanzplatz, a semi-classic cycling race in Germany. It was held, as customary on Tag der Arbeit, 1 May.

Teams
Twenty-three teams were invited to take part in the race. These included four UCI WorldTeams, eleven UCI Professional Continental teams and eight UCI Continental teams.

Result

References

External links

2016 in road cycling
2016
2016 UCI Europe Tour
Taunus